The Elias Woodward House, also known as Woodward-Gellatly House, in Corvallis, Oregon was built in 1871, in a Gothic or Rural Gothic architectural style.

It was designated by the City of Corvallis as a Historic Resource on December 2, 1982.

It was further listed on the U.S. National Register of Historic Places in 1983.

References

Houses on the National Register of Historic Places in Oregon
Gothic Revival architecture in Oregon
Houses completed in 1871
Houses in Corvallis, Oregon
National Register of Historic Places in Benton County, Oregon
1871 establishments in Oregon